The  is a Kofun period burial mound located in the town of Mibu, Shimotsuga District, Tochigi Prefecture in the northern Kantō region of Japan. It received protection as a National Historic Site in 1958.

Overview
It is located at an elevation of about 100 meters above sea level in former Hanyu Village, on the left bank of the Kurokawa River, surrounded by a golf course to the north and east. Te surrounding area contains several other large tumuli from the same time period. The Chausuyama Kofun has an overall length of 91 meters, height of 12 meters, and was built in two-tiers. It was once encircled by a moat. Fragments of haniwa were discovered on top of the burial mound, which when reconstructed proved to be a very large (180 cm) model of a house. Fragments of other haniwa and Sue ware pottery were also discovered during an excavation conducted in 1895; however, the interior of the tumulus has not been excavated. From the shape of the tumulus and the types of haniwa, the tumulus is believed to date from the second half of the 6th century AD.

The kofun is located about 25 minutes by car from Mibu Station on the Tōbu Railway Utsunomiya Line.

See also

List of Historic Sites of Japan (Tochigi)

References

External links
 Tochigi Tourist Information 

Kofun
History of Tochigi Prefecture
Mibu, Tochigi
Historic Sites of Japan
Shimotsuke Province